The Canton of Ducos is a former canton in the Arrondissement of Le Marin on Martinique. It had 17,039 inhabitants (2012). It was disbanded in 2015. The canton comprised the commune of Ducos.

References

Cantons of Martinique